Browne is a variant of the English surname Brown, meaning "brown-haired" or "brown-skinned". It may sometimes be derived from French le Brun with similar meaning. The Mac an Bhreitheamhnaigh clan of County Donegal have anglicized as Browne since about 1800.
The name has also been used throughout North America as an anglicization of the Spanish surname Pardo.

Adam Browne (born 1963), Australian writer
Andrew Browne (disambiguation), several people
Anthony Browne (disambiguation), several people
Anucha Browne Sanders, American basketball player
Aurora Browne, Canadian actress and comedian
Baron Browne, American bassist
Barrington Browne (born 1967), Guyanese cricketer
Buckston Browne (1850–1945), English physician
Bud Browne (1912–2008), American film director
Byron Browne (baseball) (born 1942), American baseball player
Carl Browne (1849–1914), American cattle rancher, cartoonist, journalist and political activist in Coxey's Army
Carolyn Browne (born 1958), British ambassador
Chance Browne (born  1948), American comic strip artist
Chris Browne (born 1952), American cartoonist
Christopher Browne (disambiguation), several people
Coral Browne (1913–1991), Australian actress
Courtney Browne (born 1970), Barbadian cricketer
Cyril Snuffy Browne (1890–1964), Barbadian cricketer
Dan Browne (born 1975), American distance runner
Daniel Browne (born 1979), New Zealand rugby player
Davey Browne (1986–2015), Australian professional boxer
David Browne (disambiguation), several people
Des Browne (born 1952), British politician
Dik Browne (1917–1989), American comic strip artist
Edward Browne (disambiguation), several people
Ernest Browne (1855–1946), Irish tennis player
Eliane Browne-Bartroli (1917–1944), British intelligence agent
Elizabeth Browne, Countess of Worcester (died 1565), lady-in-waiting to Henry VIII's second wife, Anne Boleyn
Emma Alice Browne (1835–1890), American poet
Feargal Browne (born 1973), Irish politician
Garech Browne (1939–2018), Irish arts patron
George Browne (disambiguation), several people
Hablot Knight Browne (1815–1882), British illustrator
Harrison Browne (born 1993), Canadian hockey player
Harry Browne (1933–2006), American investment analyst and political writer
Harry C. Browne (1878–1954), American banjo player and actor
Henry Browne (disambiguation), several people
Henry Gore-Browne (1830–1912), Irish soldier, recipient of the Victoria Cross
Howard Browne (1908–1999), American writer
Irene Mary Browne (1881–1977), British artist
Isaac Hawkins Browne (1705–1760) English politician and poet
Ivan Browne (born 1947), singer in American pop band The Lemon Pipers
Jack Nixon Browne (1904–1993), British politician
Jackson Browne (born 1948), American musician
James Browne (disambiguation), several people
Janet Browne (born 1950), British historian of science
Jann Browne (born 1954), American country singer
Jeremy Browne, 11th Marquess of Sligo (1939–2014), Irish peer
Jeremy Browne (born 1970), British politician
John Browne (disambiguation), several people
Joseph Browne (disambiguation), several people
Joy Browne (1944–2016), American radio psychologist
Kale Browne (born 1950), American actor
Kathie Browne (1930–2003), American actress
Kathleen Browne (1876–1943), Irish politician, farmer, writer, historian and archaeologist
Kathleen Browne (artist) (1905–2007), New Zealand artist
LaVerne Ward Browne (1906–1966), American aviator who used the stage name John Trent as an actor
Leslie Browne (born 1957), American ballet dancer
Lucille Baldwin Brown (1922–2019), American librarian
Martin Browne (1900–1980), British theatre director
Mary Browne (1891–1971), American tennis player
Mary Ann Browne (1812–1845), English poet, writer of musical scores
Maximilian Ulysses Browne (1705–1757), Austrian field marshal
McKenzie Browne (born 1995), American speed skater
Michael Browne (disambiguation), several people
Millicent Browne (1881–1975), British suffragette
Moyra Browne (1918–2016), British nurse
Nicholas Browne (1947–2014), British diplomat
Nicholas Brown-Wilkinson (1930–2018), British judge
Noël Browne (1915–1997), Irish politician and physician
Norman Anil Kumar Browne, (1951–Present) Indian Air Force (IAF) Air Chief Marshall (2011–2013)
Olin Browne (born 1959), American golfer
Patrick Browne (disambiguation), several people
Patti Ann Browne (born 1965), American broadcaster
Peter Browne (disambiguation), several people
Reginald Spencer Browne (1856–1943), Australian journalist, newspaper editor and general
Robert Browne (disambiguation), several people
Ronnie Browne (born 1937), Scottish folk singer
Roscoe Lee Browne (1922–2007), American actor
Rose Browne (1897–1986), American educator
Sam Browne (disambiguation), several people
Seán Browne (1916–1996), Irish politician
Sean K. L. Browne (born 1953), contemporary American sculptor
Sidney Browne (1850–1941), British nurse
Spencer Browne (born 2003), American musician
Stan Browne (born 1962), Australian rugby league footballer
Steven Browne (born 1989), Australian footballer
Sylvester John Browne (1841–1915), Australian pastoralist, miner and sportsman
Sylvia Browne (1936–2013), American medium
Tara Browne (1945–1966), British socialite
Sir Thomas Browne (1605–1682), English author
Thomas Browne (disambiguation), several people
Thom Browne, American fashion designer
Tim Browne (born 1987), Australian Rugby League player
Tom Browne (disambiguation), several people
Tony Browne (born 1973), Irish hurler
Tony Browne (diplomat) (born 1946), New Zealand diplomat
Tracy Browne
Travis Browne (born 1982), American mixed martial arts fighter
Ulric Browne, British actor
Valentine Browne (disambiguation), several people
Vanessa Browne (born 1963), Australian high jumper
Vincent Browne (born 1944), Irish journalist
Vincent Browne (sculptor) (born 1947), Irish sculptor
Walter Browne (1949–2015), American chess player
Wayles Browne (born 1941), American linguist and Slavist
William Browne (disambiguation), several people

See also
Brown (surname)
Broun (surname)
Earl of Kenmare, where Browne is the family name
Viscount Montagu, where Browne is the family name
Marquess of Sligo, where Browne is the family name
Baron Oranmore and Browne
Tribes of Galway, which includes Browne as one of the tribes

References

English-language surnames